Patricia Carli (born Rosetta Ardito on 12 March 1938) is an Italian and Belgian origin French  singer, songwriter, lyricist and composer.

Life and career 
Born in Taranto, Carli grew up in Belgium, where her parents had emigrated for work. After studying music and singing, she began performing in public and in a few years she became well known in Belgium and in France, where she performed at the prestigious Olympia music hall in Paris.

In partnership with Gigliola Cinquetti she won the 1964 edition of the Sanremo Music Festival, with the song "Non ho l'età".

Partial discography

45 rpm 
 1964: "Non ho l'età / Così felice" (Bel Air, ba 11001)
 1966: "Il male che fai / Un giorno a te ritornerà" (Riviera, RIV 514)

References

Further reading
 Eddy Anselmi, Festival di Sanremo. Almanacco illustrato della canzone italiana, edizioni Panini, Modena, article Carli Patricia

Italian pop singers
20th-century Italian composers
Belgian composers
French composers
1938 births
Living people
People from Taranto
Sanremo Music Festival winners
Carli, Patricia
20th-century Belgian women singers
20th-century Belgian singers
20th-century women composers
Italian emigrants to Belgium
Belgian people of Italian descent
French people of Italian descent
French people of Belgian descent
French pop singers